John Law (born 8 January 1959) is a former Australian rules footballer who represented  in the Victorian Football League (VFL).

Known for his uncompromising and direct style of play, Law spent most of his career on the half back flank and captained North Melbourne in both 1988 and 1989. He was also a sports teacher during his playing days and would later become Head of Junior School at Presbyterian Ladies' College, Melbourne.

External links

1959 births
Living people
Australian rules footballers from Victoria (Australia)
North Melbourne Football Club players